Helmar Erlewein is a German curler and curling coach.

At the international level, he is a 2008 European mixed curling champion and two-time European mixed bronze medallist (2005, 2007).

Teams

Men's

Mixed

Record as a coach of national teams

References

External links

Living people
German male curlers
European curling champions
German curling coaches
Year of birth missing (living people)
Place of birth missing (living people)
21st-century German people